The "Russian world" is the concept of social totality associated with Russian culture.

"Russian world" may also refer to:

 , a Russian newspaper published in Saint Petersburg between 1859 and 1863
 Russkiy Mir (St. Petersburg newspaper, 1871–1880), a Russian newspaper published in Saint Petersburg between 1871 and 1880
 Russkiy Mir Foundation, a Russian foundation for promotion of Russian culture
 Russian World Studios, a Russian film and television production company